Saints & Sinners is a 1992 album, released by the Canadian glam metal band of the same name. "Walk That Walk", "We Belong" and "Takin' My Chances" were released as singles. The album was produced by Aldo Nova.

Track listing
"Shake" – 4:10
"Rip It Up" – 4:45
"Walk That Walk" – 4:40
"Takin' My Chances" – 5:36
"Kiss the Bastards" – 5:03
"Wheels of Fire" – 3:51
"Lesson of Love" – 4:17
"We Belong" – 4:42
"Frankenstein" – 9:57
"Slippin' into Darkness" – 4:18

Personnel

Saints & Sinners
 Rick Hughes - vocals
 Stephane Dufour - guitars and background vocals
 Jesse Bradman - keyboards and background vocals
 Martin Bolduc - bass and background vocals
 Jeff Salem - drums

Additional Personnel
Aldo Nova - Keyboards, programming, additional acoustic guitars
Alan Jordan - background vocals
Michael Larocque - bass
Tim Harrington - bass
Alan Abrahms - bass
Daniel Hughes - drums
Peter Barbeau - drums

Production
Lennie Petze - executive producer
Produced by Aldo Nova
Paul Northfield - engineer, mixing
Simon Pressey - assistant engineer and mixing
Bob Ludwig - mastering

1992 debut albums
Albums produced by Aldo Nova